A Fazenda 7 was the seventh season of the Brazilian reality television series A Fazenda which premiered on Sunday, September 14, 2014, at 10:30 p.m. on RecordTV.

Britto Junior reprise his hosting stints for the show. Gianne Albertoni also returned as the show's new special correspondent, being also joined by actress Carla Diaz on A Fazenda Online. A Fazenda 6 was officially confirmed on September 29, 2013, during the season finale of A Fazenda 6. The grand prize was of R$2 million without tax allowances, with a brand new car offered to the runner-up.

On December 10, 2014, singer DH Silveira won the competition with 44.38% of the public vote over model Babi Rossi (37.05%) and socialite Heloisa Faissol (18.57%).

Overview

Cast
Pre-production started early to mid-February 2014. Casting was done simultaneously with casting for Aprendiz Celebridades, the tenth season of O Aprendiz, the Brazilian version of The Apprentice, that was being adapted to the  Celebrity Apprentice format at the time. The season featured eighteen new celebrities.

Twists

The camp
A half-day prior to the game officially starting, the cast was led to believe that they would enter directly into the Farm. They were, however, placed at an isolated camp miles away from the actual Farm. At the camp, contestants must create their own society, built their own shelter and figure out how to survive against the elements, while given minimal resources.

After nightfall, the contestants took part of a Bonfire ceremony, where each one should speak and then symbolically burn what they want to leave behind.

The twins
For the first time ever in a Brazilian reality show, two contestants (similar twins Pepê and Neném) will play the game as a single competitor.

Contestants
Biographical information according to Record official series site, plus footnoted additions.
(ages stated are at time of contest)

Future appearances
In 2016, Andréia Sorvetão appeared with her husband Conrado in Power Couple Brasil 1, they finished in 4th place in the competition.

In 2017, Diego Cristo and Lorena Bueri appeared as a couple in Power Couple Brasil 2, they finished in 10th place in the competition.

In 2021, Robson Caetano appeared in Dança dos Famosos 18, in an all stars season, he finished in 12th place in the competition.

The game

Key power
Since season 5, contestants compete to win the Key Power each week. The Key Power holder is the only contestant who can open the mystery box located at the Farm. However, opening the box will unleash either a good consequence or a bad consequence at the nomination process.

Since season 6, only three pre-selected contestants (one from each team) are allowed to compete each round. However, this season, one of the three is banned from competing by the current Farmer of the Week, leaving only two players at the challenge. The winner becomes the Key Power holder for the week, while the loser is sent to the barn with his whole team (minus the current Farmer if he/she is part of that team) until the vote. The Key Holder's choice is marked in bold.

In week 11, only the team with more members at this point of the game (Rabbit) competed for the Special Key Power and the other contestants were sent to the Barn.

Results

Instant choice
The Instant Choice was introduced during the first live nominations show of the season as an added interactive feature. During the designated/announced five-minute voting window, Twitter users (with public accounts only) may vote to select a contestant to receive a special opportunity not available to others (which may or may not influence directly in the game) by tweeting the option's keyword along with the show's designated hashtag.

Voting history

Notes

 :   Due to entering the house on day 5, the twins Pepê & Neném guaranteed immunity for the first nominations on week 2. Same as Cristina as she was the only one not to be chosen by any team. However, both had to live in the Barn for some days.
 :   Key Power holder Bruna opened the mystery box, which contained three envelopes: the red envelope, the envelope #1 and the envelope #2. Bruna was forbidden to open the red envelope through the Instant Choice of the public. The envelope #1 was opened and revealed that she had to choose one contestant to win an immunity and ban another contestant from nominating. She gave immunity to Lorena and banned DH. After the vote, Bruna opened the envelope #2, which asked her to choose between Cristina and Pepê & Neném to join her team (Sheep) as an extra member. She picked Cristina.
 : The eleven remaining eligible contestants were asked to save one contestant. The second nominee Diego was asked to start and he saved Leo, who saved Bruna, who saved Felipeh, who saved Débora, who saved Babi, who saved Oscar, who saved Robson, who saved Brunninha, who saved Andréia, who saved DH, leaving Roy as the third nominee.
 :  On the morning of Day 14, Roy was temporarily expelled from the Farm, after a remand ordered for non-payment of child support was issued by the authorities. Since Roy was one of the two nominees, the voting lines were frozen. During the afternoon, the debt of R$18,000 was finally paid, allowing Roy to return to the Farm during the live show. Due to the unprecedented nature of the events the eviction was canceled.
 : Key Power holder Leo opened the mystery box, which contained two envelopes: the red envelope and the main envelope. Leo was forbidden to open the red envelope through the Instant Choice of the public. After the vote, Leo opened the main envelope, which revealed that he should choose one contestant from the barn (team Ostrich) to be the third nominee. He choose Roy.
 :  Key Power holder Roy opened the mystery box, which contained two envelopes: the red envelope and the main envelope. The main envelope was opened and revealed that Roy won immunity and had to choose another contestant between the ones in the barn (team Rabbit) to be immune as well. He chose Débora. Then, Roy was allowed to open the red envelope through the Instant Choice of the public and got his nomination cancelled.
 : The eleven remaining eligible contestants were asked to save one contestant. The second nominee Felipeh was asked to start and he saved Bruna, who saved Lorena, who saved Leo, who saved Cristina, who saved Andréia, who saved Brunninha, who saved Pepê & Neném, who saved DH, who saved Marlos, who saved Babi, leaving Heloisa as the third nominee.
 :  Key Power holder Andréia opened the mystery box, which contained two envelopes: the red envelope and the main envelope. Andréia was allowed to open the red envelope through the Instant Choice of the public and won a brand new car. The main envelope was opened and revealed that the team that wasn't sent to the barn (Sheep) won immunity this week. Then, Andréia had to choose one contestant between the ones in the barn (team Rabbit) to have his nomination counted as two. She choose Babi, so her vote on Marlos counted as two votes for him.
 : The seven remaining eligible contestants were asked to save one contestant. The second nominee Marlos was asked to start and he saved Andréia, who saved DH, who saved Brunninha, who saved Pepê & Neném, who saved Débora, who saved Babi, leaving Robson as the third nominee.
 :  Key Power holder Brunninha opened the first envelope and was informed that she should give an immunity for two contestants who were in the Barn. She chose Babi and Heloisa.
 : The nine remaining eligible contestants were asked to save one contestant. The second nominee Felipeh was asked to start and he saved Leo, who saved Lorena, who saved Cristina, who saved DH, who saved Andréia, who saved Brunninha, who saved Marlos, who saved Débora, leaving the twins Pepê & Neném as the third nominee. However, Brunninha opened the second and last envelope, which said she should take the third nominee from nomination and replace them by another contestant who were not immune. Brunninha chose to put Lorena up for nomination.
 :  Key Power holder Leo opened the first envelope and was informed that he should give an immunity for two contestants. He chose Felipeh and Robson.
 : The four remaining eligible contestants were asked to save one contestant (Team Ostrich did not participate according to the second envelope on the Key Power). The second nominee Cristina was asked to start and she saved Babi, who saved Débora, who saved Leo, leaving the twins Pepê & Neném as the third nominee.
 :   Key Power holder Bruna opened the first envelope and was informed that she was immune and should choose between give an immunity for your team (Sheep) or win a R$10,000 prize money. She chose the immunity. The second envelope was informed that the contestants who were in the Barn (team Rabbit) should choose a team member to win an immunity (Babi) and another to be automatically nominated (Andréia).
 :   Key Power holder Marlos opened the first envelope and was informed that he should choose between nominate a contestant automatically for eviction and he win a brand new car or be automatically nominated and win a brand new car to himself. He chose the latter and was automatically nominated. The second envelope was informed that he should give an immunity for one contestant who were in the Barn. He chose Heloisa.
 :   Key Power holder DH opened the first envelope and was informed that he gained an immunity and ban another contestant from nominating (Babi). The second envelope was informed that he would be the last "Farmer of the Week". In the nominations on the following day he opened a third envelope (for this, the public should vote yes or no to open. The majority chose yes.) and was informed that the last contestant saved from eviction (Babi) was exempt from nominations.
 : From this point on, there will be no Farmer of Week in the game. In an event of a tie, the current Key Power holder will have the casting vote.
 :   Key Power holder Heloisa opened the super special mystery box which contained five develops, however, only the first three would be applicable for this round's voting. Heloisa opened the first envelope and was required to choose one contestant to win a brand new car (Babi). Then, the second envelope revealed that she won a free pass to the final. Finally, in the third envelope she was informed that should choose, with Andréia, Babi and Pepê & Neném, a contestant from the Barn to be automatically nominated (Leo).
 : After the vote, Heloisa was asked in private by host Britto Jr., to deliver each one of the two remaining envelopes in the box (the orange and the purple envelopes) to the two nominees (Leo and Marlos), already knowing the content inside them. Only one envelope would be open in the next round's voting, by the contestat who survives the eviction. Heloisa decided to give the purple to Leo (immunity and the power to nominate another contestant automatically for eviction) and the orange to Marlos (automatically nominated and the power to give immunity to another contestant).
 :   After surviving the tenth eviction, Leo was banned from the eleventh's house vote through the Instant Choice of the public. However, he played his purple envelope in the nominations, won immunity and choose the twins Pepê & Neném to be automatically nominated.
 : Andréia and Brunninha received the most nominations with 3 each. Heloisa, as Key Power holder, had the casting vote and chose Brunninha to be the second nominee.
 : Babi and DH received the most nominations with 3 each. Leo, as Key Power holder, had the casting vote and chose Babi to be the first nominee.
 : The four remaining eligible contestants were asked to save one contestant. The first nominee Babi was asked to start and she saved Andréia, who saved Leo, who saved DH, leaving the twins Pepê & Neném as the second nominee.
 : Key Power holder Leo opened the mystery box which contained two envelopes. In the first envelope, he was informed that he should replace one of the nominees with one eligible contestant (Andréia or DH). He saved twins Pepê & Neném and chose Andréia to replace them. Then, he was allowed to open the red envelope through the Instant Choice of the public, so all contestants were sent to the barn.
 :  The four eligible contestants competed in a special nomination challenge. Leo and Babi were eliminated in the first and second places respectively and became the nominees.
 : Each semi-finalist was asked to choose an evicted contestant (exempting Andréia and Marlon, which already had won a car) to win a brand new car. The chosen ones were: Débora (by Babi), Brunninha (by DH), Cristina (by Heloisa) and Robson (by Pepê & Neném). Then, the viewers were asked to vote for one of them to win the prize, where Débora won.
 :  On day 85, all evicted contestants returned to the farm to choose the first nominee. In the vote, both DH and Pepê & Neném received 6 votes each. Débora, for being chosen to win a prize by viewers, had to cast the vote to break the tie. She chose Pepê & Neném to be the first nominee.
 : Due to being nominated, only Pepê & Neném were eligible to nominate. They choose Babi to be the second nominee, therefore, DH automatically became a finalist.
 : For the final, the public votes for the contestant they want to win A Fazenda 7.

Ratings

Brazilian ratings
All numbers are in points and provided by IBOPE.

 In 2014, each point represents 65.000 households in São Paulo.

Notes
 Episode 13 aired on September 26 as a 15-minute special due to the Governor's debates on Record.
 Episode 15 aired on September 28 as a 30-minute special due to the first Presidential debate on Record, which delayed the show to a late-night timeslot.
 Episode 36 aired on October 19 as a 30-minute special due to the second Presidential debate on Record, which delayed the show to a late-night timeslot.

References

External links
 Official Site 

2014 Brazilian television seasons
A Fazenda